The Dod-13 gene in the worm Caenorhabditis elegans encoding a cytochrome p450 enzyme, which have steroid hydroxylase activity, with the CYP Symbol CYP35B1 (Cytochrome P450, family 35, member B1). Dod-13 is downstream gene of Daf-16 influenced the lifespan of C. elegans.

References 

Caenorhabditis elegans genes
35